Ratera is a village in the Bhiwani district of the Indian state of Haryana. Its old name is Ratangarh. , the village had 1,039 households with a population of 5,572 of which 2,923 were male and 2,649 female.

It has two temples and one gurdwara.
Nearest railway station of ratera is as follow:-
Hansi-17km
Bawani khera-23km
Hisar-30km
Bhiwani-38km

References

Villages in Bhiwani district